Claire Brindis , DrPH, is a Distinguished Emerita Professor of Pediatrics and Health Policy (on Recall), Department of Pediatrics and Department of Obstetrics, Gynecology and Reproductive Health Sciences and Emerita Director of the Philip R. Lee Institute for Health Policy Studies at the University of California, San Francisco (UCSF). Her research considers women's, adolescent and child health, as well as adolescent pregnancy prevention strategies. She was elected a member of the Institute of Medicine (now the National Academy of Medicine) in 2010.

Early life and education 
Brindis was a first generation immigrant to the United States. Her family are from Argentina, and her parents both worked as translators for the Los Angeles court system. She attended University of California, Los Angeles as an undergraduate, where she studied sociology and graduated cum laude. After earning her Bachelor's degree Brindis worked toward a Master of Public Health. She was a doctoral researcher at the University of California, Berkeley. During her doctorate, Brindis took part in a seminar on adolescent health. Her doctoral thesis considered how adolescent development impacted sexual and contraceptive behaviour.

Research and career 
Brindis started her career in the area of reproductive health and how disparities impact health outcomes. She joined the faculty at the University of California, San Francisco in 1983. Brindis was involved with the first evaluation of the 1115 Medicare waiver, which supported subsidised family planning in California. The success of the programme led Brindis to expand her programme.  She has studied the impact of implementing the Affordable Care Act on young adults and the health of participants of the Deferred Action for Childhood Arrivals programme. 

In February 2020 Brindis and her husband Ralph Brindis established the Institute for Medical Education Brindis Family Fund.

Awards and honours 

 1994 California Department of Health Services Beverlee A. Meyer Award for Excellence in Public Health
 2000 US Department of Health and Human Services Integrity Award from the Office of the Inspector General
 2005 Federal Maternal and Child Health Bureau Director’s Award: In Recognition of Contributions Made to the Health of Infants, Mothers, Children, Adolescents & Children with Special Needs
 2009 UCSF Chancellor’s Award for the Advancement of Women 
 2012 UCLA School of Public Health Alumni Hall of Fame 
 2014 American Public Health Association Carl Schultz Lifetime Achievement Award
 2016 UCSF Lifetime Achievement in Mentoring Award
 2018 UC Berkeley School of Public Health 75 Most Influential Public Health Alumni
 2020 American Public Health Association Martha May Eliot Award Winners
 2020 School-Based Health Alliance Pioneer Award
 2021 Maternal and Child Health Bureau Title V Lifetime Achievement Award

Select publications

References 

Living people
Year of birth missing (living people)
American pediatricians
University of California, Berkeley alumni
University of California, Los Angeles alumni
UCSF School of Medicine faculty
Members of the National Academy of Medicine